A list of the early pre-war films produced in the Philippines from 1912 to 1939. For an A-Z see :Category:Philippine films

1905–1929

1930s

References

External links
 Filipino film at the Internet Movie Database

1910s
Films
Philippines
Films
Philippines
Films
Philippines